William Field Nankivell (born 7 September 1923) is an Australian retired politician.

He was born in Mount Gambier and served in the Royal Australian Air Force during World War II from 1944 to 1945. He was a farmer and company director before entering politics. He represented the South Australian House of Assembly seats of Albert from 1959 to 1970 and Mallee from 1970 to 1979 for the Liberal and Country League and Liberal Party. He was a member of the Parliamentary Committee on Land Settlement (1963–1968), Parliamentary Standing Committee on Public Works (1968–1973) and Public Accounts Committee (1973–1977).

References

 

1923 births
Living people
Members of the South Australian House of Assembly
Liberal Party of Australia members of the Parliament of South Australia
Liberal and Country League politicians
Royal Australian Air Force personnel of World War II
Royal Australian Air Force airmen
Military personnel from South Australia